Molla Qasem (also Romanized as Mollā Qāsem) is a village in Sahandabad Rural District, Tekmeh Dash District, Bostanabad County, East Azerbaijan Province, Iran. At the 2006 census, its population was 70, in 21 families.

References 

Populated places in Bostanabad County